The Three Buddhas may refer to:

 Trikaya, the Buddhist doctrine of the Three Buddhas
 The three Buddhas depicted in traditional Chinese temple halls: Gautama Buddha (Shakyamuni), Bhaisajyaguru Buddha and Amitabha Buddha
 Three Buddha Hall (Sanbutsudō, 三仏堂) at the Rinnō-ji temple in Nikko, Japan
 Three Buddhas Hall, at the Puhua Temple in Taihuai Town, Wutai County, Xinzhou, China
 Sam Poh Tong Temple (also known as the Three Buddhas Cave) in Ipoh, Perak, Malaysia

See also
 Payathonzu Temple (Temple of Three Buddhas), a Buddhist temple in Minnanthu, Burma
 Three types of buddha